Boiling Springs is a town in Cleveland County, North Carolina, United States and is located in the westernmost part of the Charlotte metropolitan area, located approximately 50 miles away from the city. As of the 2010 census, the town's population was 4,647. It is home to Gardner–Webb University. The town is named after the natural spring found on the university's property, which feeds a small lake.

History 

People began settling the area around the namesake boiling springs in 1843. The first families to settle were the Hamricks, the Greenes and the McSwains. It was only appropriate that the settlement be named Boiling Springs. One of the first buildings was Boiling Springs Baptist Church, built in 1847 about 100 yards from the springs. Boiling Springs was known as a sleepy community, with no railroads, no industries, few stores and no paved streets. At the turn of the 20th century Kings Mountain Baptist and Sandy Run Associations began looking for a place to build their denominational high school and chose Boiling Springs because it was geographically situated between the two associations and because the Boiling Springs community made concerted efforts to attract the school. The Boiling Springs High School boarding institution opened for business in 1905. School authorities felt that neither intoxicating drinks nor cigarettes should be sold near the school, so in 1911 the town was incorporated in order to ban the sale of such items. Town limits were decided by drawing a mile and a half radius from the school's original bell tower.

Incorporation of the town proved to be a major step forward because it provided a government that could function and enable the town not only to grow but to furnish water, police and fire protection, paved streets and garbage collection for the town and the school. As time progressed the growth of the town was largely tied to the growth of the Boiling Springs High School which became the Boiling Springs Junior College in 1928, Gardner Webb Junior College in 1942, and finally after achieving status as a senior college and developing several graduate programs, Gardner–Webb University in 1993.

Voters approved ordinances to allow for the sale of beer, unfortified wine, and malt beverages within town limits in 2018.

E. B. Hamrick Hall and the Irvin-Hamrick Log House are listed on the National Register of Historic Places.

Geography
Boiling Springs is located in southwestern Cleveland County at  (35.251752, -81.664288). North Carolina Highway 150 passes through the town, leading east  to Shelby, the county seat, and south  to Gaffney, South Carolina.

Government 

The Town of Boiling Springs' Council-Manager form of government with a Mayor and five Councilmen (one of whom serves as Mayor Pro-Tem) who are each elected at-large in staggered four year terms. The Town Council appoints a town attorney and town manager to advise the council and oversee the town's operations. All other staff report to the town manager, who manages the day-to-day operations.

Demographics

2020 census

As of the 2020 United States census, there were 4,615 people, 1,144 households, and 877 families residing in the town.

2000 census
As of the census of 2000, there were 3,866 people, 1,117 households, and 832 families residing in the town. The population density was 891.7 people per square mile (343.9/km2). There were 1,184 housing units at an average density of 273.1 per square mile (105.3/km2). The racial makeup of the town was 89.29% White, 8.67% African American, 0.13% Native American, 0.78% Asian, 0.41% from other races, and 0.72% from two or more races. Hispanic or Latino of any race were 1.40% of the population.

There were 1,117 households, out of which 38.7% had children under the age of 18 living with them, 62.9% were married couples living together, 9.7% had a female householder with no husband present, and 25.5% were non-families. 21.6% of all households were made up of individuals, and 7.0% had someone living alone who was 65 years of age or older. The average household size was 2.57 and the average family size was 3.02.

In the town the population was spread out, with 20.9% under the age of 18, 30.2% from 18 to 24, 24.5% from 25 to 44, 15.5% from 45 to 64, and 8.8% who were 65 years of age or older. The median age was 24 years. For every 100 females, there were 89.8 males. For every 100 females age 18 and over, there were 82.8 males.

The median income for a household in the town was $48,861, and the median income for a family was $54,837. Males had a median income of $38,098 versus $24,559 for females. The per capita income for the town was $14,984. About 3.6% of families and 5.6% of the population were below the poverty line, including 2.4% of those under age 18 and 7.7% of those age 65 or over.

Schools

 Gardner-Webb University (private accredited university)
 Willow Tree Community School (private school)
 Crest Middle School (Cleveland County Public Schools)
 Crest High School (Cleveland County Public Schools)
 Boiling Springs Elementary (Cleveland County Public Schools)
 Springmore Elementary (Cleveland County Public Schools)

Transportation
Air travel
 Greenville-Spartanburg International Airport is located 47 miles (76 km) south of Boiling Springs.
Roads 
 NC Route 150 runs directly through town.
 Interstate 85 is 13 miles (21 km) south and 25 miles (40 km) east of the town.
Pedestrian and bicycle
 A bike lane along NC 150 (South Main) connects to the Broad River Greenway. 
 Pedestrian facilities are limited.

Notable people 
 W. J. Cash, author
 Blake Lalli, former MLB player
 Gerald R. Murray, 14th Chief Master Sergeant of the Air Force
 Ron Rash, poet, short story writer, and novelist
David Thompson, former NBA player

References

External links

 Town of Boiling Springs official website
 Town of Boiling Springs

Cities in North Carolina
Cities in Cleveland County, North Carolina